Platte County School District may refer to:

 Platte County School District Number 1
 Platte County School District Number 2
 Platte County School District Number 3